José Luis de la Cruz Melo (born 5 July 2000) is a Dominican footballer who plays as a right back for Spanish Tercera División club RCD Carabanchel and the Dominican Republic national team.

International career
De la Cruz made his senior debut for the Dominican Republic national football team on 25 January 2021.

Personal life
De la Cruz also holds Spanish citizenship.

References

External links

2000 births
Living people
People from Azua Province
Dominican Republic footballers
Association football fullbacks
Association football wingers
Dominican Republic international footballers
Dominican Republic emigrants to Spain
Naturalised citizens of Spain
Footballers from the Community of Madrid
Spanish footballers
CF Rayo Majadahonda players
Tercera División players